Kamalakanta Hansda is an Indian politician from Bharatiya Janata Party. In May 2021, he was elected as a member of the West Bengal Legislative Assembly from Kashipur (constituency). He defeated Swapan Kumar Beltharia of All India Trinamool Congress by 7,240 votes in 2021 West Bengal Assembly election.

References 

Living people
Year of birth missing (living people)
21st-century Indian politicians
People from Purulia district
Bharatiya Janata Party politicians from West Bengal
West Bengal MLAs 2021–2026